Hirst may refer to:

In people:
Hirst (surname), a surname (including a list of people with the name)

In places:
 Hirst, North Lanarkshire, a settlement in North Lanarkshire, Scotland
 Hirst, Northumberland, a settlement and former parish in Ashington, England

See also
 Hearst (disambiguation)
 Hurst (disambiguation)